Inna Zhukova (: Inna Ivanovna Zhukova, born on September 6, 1986 in Krasnodar, Soviet Union) is a Belarusian individual rhythmic gymnast. She is the 2008 Olympics individual all-around silver medalist and 2006 Grand Prix Final all-around bronze medalist.

Biography 
Early Career

Zhukova started rhythmic gymnastics in 1990 at age 4. Originally, she trained in Russia, but she was invited to train in Belarus with the coach Irina Leparskaya, who has trained many prominent gymnasts.

Zhukova made her international debut in 2001.

Athens Olympics

At the 2004 Athens Olympics she came 7th in the All-Around competition with a total score of 100.575 (Hoop 25.00, Ball 25.300, Clubs 25.200, Ribbon 25.075).

Post-Athens

At the 2007 World Championships in Patras, Greece Zhukova placed 4th in the all-around and won the bronze medal in the rope finals. Belarus finished second in the team competition, so Zhukova and her teammates were awarded team silver.

Beijing Olympics

At the 2008 Beijing Olympics, Zhukova placed fourth in qualifications with a score of 70.950. She advanced to the finals and won the all-around silver medal with a score of 71.925.

Post-Beijing: Retirement

After the Beijing 2008 she decided to finish her active competitive career. Zhukova is no longer an active competitor in world class rhythmic gymnastics, except to give occasional gala exhibitions (e.g. at LA Lights in Feb, 2009).  it is reported that Zhukova is working for an insurance company in Belarus.

Routine music information

Detailed Olympic results

References

External links

1986 births
Living people
Sportspeople from Krasnodar
Belarusian rhythmic gymnasts
Gymnasts at the 2004 Summer Olympics
Gymnasts at the 2008 Summer Olympics
Olympic silver medalists for Belarus
Olympic gymnasts of Belarus
Olympic medalists in gymnastics
Medalists at the 2008 Summer Olympics
Medalists at the Rhythmic Gymnastics World Championships
Medalists at the Rhythmic Gymnastics European Championships
Universiade medalists in gymnastics
Universiade bronze medalists for Belarus
Medalists at the 2005 Summer Universiade
21st-century Belarusian women

Russian emigrants to Belarus